The HP Brio was a line of desktop personal computers made by Hewlett-Packard.

The 7000 series was targeted at mainstream business computing, and started with a street price of $2449, inclusive of a 15-inch monitor. The 8000 was designed for "power-hungry" business users. Both series were announced in September 1998.

In June 1999, HP announced Brio models BA and BAx that included Microsoft Office 2000 Small Business. They were launched at street prices of $999 and $1,499 respectively.

Announced in October 1999 at an estimated street price of $499, the BA200 was aimed at small businesses that purchase white box PCs—non-branded PCs assembled by resellers or consumer PCs from manufacturers such as eMachines at retail. The PCs came ready for Windows 2000, and were certified for Novell network operating systems, for easy integration into a networked environment. They also shipped with HP Brio Internet Center and HP Brio Center, which together provided comprehensive Internet and e-commerce capabilities and online support.

Alongside HP's announcement of a new HP Brio Business PC line with the HP Brio Internet Center, HP also announced an agreement with AT&T; WorldNet Service to provide small- and medium-business customers with fast, easy access to the Internet. The alliance with AT&T was meant to provide small and medium businesses with an end-to-end solution—from initial connection to creating a Web site and online store.

In 1998, HP partnered with Symantec to incorporate pcANYWHERE32, a remote-control software package, on all HP Brio PCs for small and medium companies without an information technology (IT) staff.

Geared for small business users, the value lines of Brio PCs offered on-screen and online tech support. The latter came via a customized Yahoo! web site that featured news, business tips, stock reports, and product-specific service and support content from HP.

In May 2000, the HP Brio BA200 placed sixth on PC World's May list of Top 10 Budget PCs.

In January 2002, Netscape Communications announced that it had licensed its Netcenter Web portal to Hewlett-Packard for the Brio line of business computers.

Models
The following is a list of all HP Brio models ever launched. "x" in the following names is a variable for models 71-85.

HP Brio 71xx
HP Brio 80xx
HP Brio 81xx
HP Brio 82xx
HP Brio 83xx
HP Brio 84xx
HP Brio 85xx
HP Brio BA200
HP Brio BA210
HP Brio BA400
HP Brio BA410
HP Brio BA600
HP Brio BAx
HP Brio BA
HP Brio BA300

References

Brio